Howard J. Hunter Jr. (December 19, 1946 – January 7, 2007) was a  Democratic member of the North Carolina General Assembly representing the state's fifth House district, including constituents in Bertie, Gates, Hertford and Perquimans (and formerly Northampton) counties.  A funeral director from Ahoskie, North Carolina, Hunter served nine full terms in the state House of Representatives. After being elected to a tenth term in November 2006, Hunter died on January 7, 2007, before the new legislature convened. He was born in Washington, D.C.

His son, Howard J. Hunter III, sought to replace his father in the seat, but local Democratic Party leaders instead nominated retired court clerk Annie Mobley. The younger Hunter was eventually elected to the House, in 2014.

External links
Official legislative site

References

Members of the North Carolina House of Representatives
People from Ahoskie, North Carolina
2007 deaths
American funeral directors
1946 births
20th-century American politicians
21st-century American politicians